The forest bittern (Zonerodius heliosylus) is a bird indigenous to New Guinea. It is the only member of the genus Zonerodius and is also known as the New Guinea tiger heron.

References

External links
Forest Bittern Zonerodius heliosylus, BirdLife International
Zonerodius heliosylus: Forest Bittern, Zipcode Zoo

forest bittern
Birds of New Guinea
forest bittern
Taxa named by René Lesson